Guam Highway 12 (GH-12) is one of the primary automobile highways in the United States territory of Guam.

Route description
GH-12 is a short connector route that runs eastward from GH-2 through the northern part of residential Agat towards the Ordnance Annex Naval facility in Santa Rita. At the entrance, GH-12 turns north and connects to GH-5 running north then west.

Major intersections

References

12